Reuben and the Dark are a Canadian indie folk band from Calgary, Alberta. Led by singer and songwriter Reuben Bullock, the band also currently includes Sam Harrison (guitar/keys/vocals) Brock Geiger (guitar/keys/vocals), Nathan da Silva (bass/vocals), and Brendan 'Dino' Soares (drums).

History

Bullock released solo albums Pulling Up Arrows in 2010 and Man Made Lakes in 2012 before deciding to adopt a band name. The band signed to Arts & Crafts Productions in 2013.

The full band's debut album Funeral Sky, produced by Christopher Hayden of Florence and the Machine and Stephen Kozmeniuk, was released on Arts & Crafts in 2014. The album was supported by a concert tour of both Canada and the United States, as well as a smaller follow-up tour of Western Canada.

In 2016, they released the single "Heart in Two", and toured North America as an opening act for Vance Joy. "Heart in Two" reached #1 on CBC Radio 2's Radio 2 Top 20 chart the week of February 12, 2016.

In 2018 the band released their second album Arms of a Dream, as well as a cover of The Tragically Hip's "Bobcaygeon" as a charity single to benefit the Gord Downie and Chanie Wenjack Fund. During the tour for the Arms of a Dream album across Canada, the band's tour bus crashed on the Trans-Canada Highway near to Banff National Park. Whilst the vehicles were written off, the band members only suffered slight injuries and were able to continue their tour, even though some of their instruments were damaged beyond repair.

In February 2019 the band released a stand-alone digital single "Hold Me Like A Fire" along with a collaboration video produced by the National Music Centre during their artist in residence program. On October 25, 2019, the band released their third album un love. Also in 2019, their song Black Water, from the album Funeral Sky, was featured in the trailer for El Camino: A Breaking Bad Movie. The band also contributed a cover of What a Wonderful World for the soundtrack of the 2020 film Dolittle.

Discography

Reuben Bullock
Pulling Up Arrows (2010)
Man Made Lakes (2012)

Reuben and the Dark
Funeral Sky (2014)
Arms of a Dream (2018)
un love (stylised as un|love) (2019)
In Lieu of Light (2022)

References

Musical groups from Calgary
Musical groups established in 2012
Canadian indie folk groups
2012 establishments in Alberta